The St. Nicholas Chapel is a historic Russian Orthodox church in the Alaska Native village of Nondalton, Alaska, United States. Now it is under Diocese of Alaska of the Orthodox Church in America

The congregation was established in 1896 at Old Nondalton, and its first building was constructed in that year. The current building dates to the 1920s, and was moved when the whole community of Nondalton moved to its present location. Most of the building is topped by a gable roof; the altar area is topped by a pyramidal section. The building has survived a number of fires that swept the community.

The building was listed on the National Register of Historic Places in 1980.

See also
National Register of Historic Places listings in Lake and Peninsula Borough, Alaska

References

Buildings and structures in Lake and Peninsula Borough, Alaska
Churches completed in 1930
Churches on the National Register of Historic Places in Alaska
Russian Orthodox church buildings in Alaska
Buildings and structures on the National Register of Historic Places in Lake and Peninsula Borough, Alaska